Governor Bartley may refer to:

Mordecai Bartley (1783–1870), 18th Governor of Ohio
Thomas W. Bartley (1812–1885), 17th Governor of Ohio